The word seneschal can have several different meanings, all of which reflect certain types of supervising or administering in a historic context. Most commonly, a seneschal was a senior position filled by a court appointment within a royal, ducal, or noble household during the Middle Ages and early Modern period – historically a steward or majordomo of a medieval great house. In a medieval royal household, a seneschal was in charge of domestic arrangements and the administration of servants, which, in the medieval period particularly, meant the seneschal might oversee hundreds of laborers, servants and their associated responsibilities, and have a great deal of power in the community, at a time when much of the local economy was often based on the wealth and responsibilities of such a household.

A second meaning is more specific, and concerns the late medieval and early modern nation of France, wherein the seneschal was also a royal officer in charge of justice and control of the administration of certain southern provinces called seneschalties, holding a role equivalent to a northern French bailiff.

In the United Kingdom the modern meaning of seneschal is primarily as an ecclesiastical term, referring to a cathedral official.

Origin
The Medieval Latin discifer (dish-bearer) was an officer in the household of later Anglo-Saxon kings, and it is sometimes translated by historians as seneschal, although the term was not used in England before the Norman Conquest.

The term, first attested in 1350–1400, was borrowed from Anglo-Norman seneschal "steward", from Old Dutch  "senior retainer" (attested in Latin  (692 AD), Old High German ), a compound of - (cf. Gothic  "old",  "oldest") and  "servant", ultimately a calque of Late Latin  "senior guard".

The scholae in the late Roman Empire referred to the imperial guard, divided into senior (seniores) and junior (juniores) units. The captain of the guard was known as comes scholarum. When Germanic tribes took over the Empire, the scholae were merged or replaced with the Germanic king's warband (cf. Vulgar Latin , OHG , Old English ) whose members also had duties in their lord's household like a royal retinue. The king's chief warbandman and retainer (cf. Old Saxon , OHG ,  OE), from the 5th century on, personally attended on the king, as specifically stated in the Codex Theodosianus of 413 (Cod. Theod. VI. 13. 1; known as comes scholae). The warband, once sedentary, became first the king's royal household, and then his great officers of state, and in both cases the seneschal is synonymous with steward.

In France
In late medieval and early modern France, the seneschal was originally a royal steward overseeing the entire country but developed into an agent of the crown charged with administration of a seneschalty, one of the districts of the crown lands in Languedoc and Normandy. Hallam states that the first seneschals to govern in this manner did so by an 1190 edict of Philip II. The seneschals also served as the chief justice of the royal courts in their areas.

The equivalent post throughout most of northern France was the bailiff, who oversaw a bailiwick.

 William de Gometz was Seneschal of France .
 Osbern the Steward was seneschal to two dukes of Normandy.

Under rulers of England
 Bertram de Criol, then member of the King's Council, Lord Warden of the Cinque Ports, Constable of Dover Castle, and Keeper of the Archbishopric of Canterbury, and shortly to become Constable of the Tower of London, is referred to as "our Seneschal" in Letters of King Henry III of December 1239.
 Sir William Felton, an English knight, was appointed seneschal of Poitou in 1360.
 Sir Thomas Felton, an English knight, was appointed seneschal of Aquitaine in 1362 and seneschal of Bordeaux in 1372.
 Sir John Chandos, an English knight, was appointed seneschal of Poitou in 1369.

In Anglo-Saxon England

In Anglo-Saxon England dish-bearers (in Medieval Latin discifer or dapifer) were nobles who served at royal feasts. The term is often translated by historians as "seneschal".

In Sark

The Seneschal of Sark presides over the Court of the Seneschal, which hears civil and some criminal cases.

See also
Grand maître de France – the Great Officer of the Crown of France in charge of the Royal Household (the "Maison du Roi")
Marshal
Majordomo
Sheriff, another Germanic-rooted title of command over a jurisdiction, derived from "shire" and "reeve".
Sir Kay, a legendary seneschal in the court of King Arthur.
Ednyfed Fychan, 13th-century Seneschal of the Kingdom of Gwynedd.
Barons Dunboyne, Seneschal of Tipperary, Ireland.
Kingdom of Alba Seneschals, Scottish Steward

References

Citations

Bibliography
EtymologyOnline
This entry is in part from Webster's Dictionary (1913)

External links

Court titles
Court titles in the Ancien Régime
Legal history of the Ancien Régime
Offices in the Ancien Régime
Historical legal occupations
Obsolete occupations